Auckland Region Women's Corrections Facility (ARWCF) is a women's prison in the Wiri suburb of Manukau City, Auckland, New Zealand. Also in the vicinity are the Wiri Mens Corrections Facility and Korowai Manaaki Youth Justice Facility. It opened in 2006 and is the first purpose-built women's prison in New Zealand; there are two older women's prisons. About 6 per cent of the New Zealand prisoner population is female.
±
The facility houses about 330 prisoners including remand prisoners - alleged criminals not yet sentenced - as well as normal sentenced prisoners. It has a specialist unit for mothers and babies. A small number of women give birth while serving a sentence of imprisonment and others have young children at the time of sentencing. Some prisoners with babies (up to nine months) may be eligible to live in the mothers and babies unit.

The prison is built in a rehabilitated quarry site. Construction of the 38 buildings cost NZ$159 million and was carried out substantially by Sinclair Knight Merz. The site is 47 ha in size, of which 13 ha are currently covered by buildings, leaving room for future expansion, which was included in the design parameters.

References

External links 
Auckland Region Women's Corrections Facility (official prison webpage)
Archived page

Buildings and structures in Auckland
Women's prisons in New Zealand
2000s architecture in New Zealand